The Slovenia national futsal team is the national futsal team of Slovenia and is controlled by the Football Association of Slovenia. It represents the country in international futsal competitions, such as the World Cup and the European Championship.

Competitive record

FIFA Futsal World Cup

UEFA European Futsal Championship

Grand Prix de Futsal

Mediterranean Cup

Statistics

Most appearances

Last updated: 12 March 2023

Top goalscorers

Last updated: 12 March 2023

Managers

References

External links
Official website 

 
European national futsal teams
national